Douthyam is a 1989 Indian Malayalam-language action thriller film directed by P. Anil and written by Gayathri Ashokan. The film stars Mohanlal, Suresh Gopi, Parvathy, and Babu Antony. The film attracted media attention for the action subject as the script was done by the poster designer Gayathri Ashokan.

Plot 

An army aircraft crashes in a dense forest. Captain Roy Jacob, starts his mission to rescue his colleagues from the dense forest, but he had to fight against a terrorist group hiding in the forest, moreover has to recover some confidential documents as well.

Cast 
 Mohanlal as Capt. Roy Jacob Thomas
 Suresh Gopi as Capt. Suresh G. Nair
 Parvathy Jayaram as Viji
 Lissy as Lisa
 Vijayaraghavan as Capt. Rajiv Kumar
 M. G. Soman as Col. Madhavan Nair
 Babu Antony as Gang Leader
 Prathapachandran as Major Karunakaran
 Sreenath as Shekhar 
 Kollam Thulasi as Army Officer Sukumaran Marar
 Kalabhavan Rahman as Gang Member

Adaptations
The film was dubbed into Tamil as Captain Dhevaram and was well received. The film was remade into Telugu as Adavilo Abhimanyudu, starring Jagapathi Babu.

References

External links
 

1989 films
1980s Malayalam-language films
1980s action adventure films
Indian action adventure films
Films about terrorism in India
Indian Army in films
Malayalam films remade in other languages